Joaquim Peris de Vargas (1880 – February 7, 1959) was a former President of FC Barcelona. He was one of the most controversial Presidents in the history of FC Barcelona. He began his career as manager in 1910 as he occupied the vice presidency, a position he held with various presidents. Taking advantage of Pay Àlvar resignation in September 1914, Vargas Peris assumed leadership of FC Barcelona. His spell in charge at the club was marked by constant controversy, because I always wanted to impose his opinion and even got the players rebelling against him. Vargas was famous for his quote: "I am Barcelona." He left the organization at the request of the general assembly of FC Barcelona and he was forced to resign at the end of the season 1914–15.

1880 births
1959 deaths
FC Barcelona presidents